Chen Kuang-fu (born 25 October 1955) is a Taiwanese politician. He is the Magistrate of Penghu County at first between 2014 and 2018, and again since 25 December 2022.

Early life
Chen was born at Shagang Village, Huxi Township, Penghu County on 25 October 1955.

Early career
Chen is the founder of the first distillery in Penghu. He also had pushed for direct flight between Penghu and Liuqiu Island in Pingtung County.

Political career

2005 Penghu County magistracy election
Chen joined the 2005 Penghu County magistracy election under Democratic Progressive Party (DPP) on 3 December 2005. However, he lost to Wang Chien-fa of the Kuomintang.

2008 Legislative Yuan election
On 12 January 2008, Chen joined the 2008 Republic of China legislative election as a DPP candidate from Penghu County constituency. However, he lost the election.

2014 Penghu County magistrate election

In 2014, Chen joined election campaign for the position of Magistrte of Penghu County with his election slogan Leading Penghu, for your and my happiness. He called for the development of winter tourism, the restoration of marine resources, the revitalization of disused land, implementation of care for the elderly, reinvigorating free trade and the economy to create more jobs, ensuring priority airplane tickets for local residents, increase of medical facilities, promotion of cultural creative industry, protection of the rights of farmers, fishermen and laborers, conservation of cultural heritage and providing stability for teachers and civil servants.

Chen was eventually elected as the Magistrate of Penghu County after winning the 2014 Penghu County magistrate election held on 29 November 2014.

2018 Penghu County magistrate election

Personal life
Chen's wife runs a free English-language cram school program.

See also
 Penghu

References

External links

 

1955 births
Living people
Magistrates of Penghu County